Saparmamed Nepeskuliev is a freelance journalist who has contributed to Alternative Turkmenistan News, a human rights group based in The Netherlands, and Radio Free Europe/Radio Liberty, a U.S.-sponsored independent media organization under the Broadcasting Board of Governors. Until July 2015, he worked in Turkmenistan reporting on "poverty, official privilege, failing infrastructure, and deficient schools" when he was detained on July 7 at the Awaza resort by agents from the Turkmen National Security Ministry. As of July 13, 2016, he still remains in prison. According to Freedom House's 2016 report on Global Press Freedom, Turkmenistan is the second least press-free country in the world.

Arrest details 
According to an interview with one of Nepeskuliev's former cellmates published on the Broadcasting Board of Governors website, the journalist was in Krasnovodsk to take pictures of the Awaza resort in Türkmenbaşy, Turkmenistan when he was framed for possession of an illegal drug. When he was out of his hotel taking pictures, he left his luggage at the hotel where Tramadol, a pain medication containing opioids, was placed inside of it. When Nepeskuliev returned to the hotel and tried to leave, he was met by two agents from the Turkmen National Security Ministry who arrested him.

According to the cellmate, such matters are usually the responsibility of the "Drugs Police" [sic], not the National Security Ministry.

International reaction 
Since Saparmamed's arrest, several NGOs and governmental officials like Human Rights Watch, Dunja Mijatović (the Representative on Freedom of the Media for the Organization for Security and Cooperation in Europe), the Committee to Protect Journalists,  John Lansing (the CEO and Director of the Broadcasting Board of Governors), U.S. Congressman Adam Schiff, and the United Nations have called for his release.

On June 30, 2016, thirteen representatives of media and human rights organizations sent a letter to Turkmen President Gurbanguly Berdimuhamedow (as well as other international officials like U.S. Secretary of State John Kerry and the Turkmen foreign minister Rashid Meredov) calling for Nepeskuliev's release.

References

Turkmenistan journalists
Imprisoned journalists
21st-century Turkmenistan writers